Tinana South is a rural locality in the Fraser Coast Region, Queensland, Australia.

Geography 
The Mary River forms the western boundary of the locality, while Tinana Creek forms the eastern boundary.

The Bruce Highway passes through the locality from north (Tinana) to south (Glenorchy).

The principal land use is irrigated cropping, principally sugarcane. There is also grazing on native vegetation.

History 
Local residents requested the Queensland Government provide a school for the local area, pointing out that children were having to walk three or four miles to the school in Tinana. Local farmer John Parke offered  of his property "Spring Grove" for the Teddington State School (as it was originally planned to be named). The school was officially opened 24 October 1914 by  the Under-Secretary for the Department of Education, John Douglas Story. The school admitted its first 21 students on 11 November 1914; the first teacher was Grace Smith. On 24 November 1914 it was officially announced that the school would be renamed Parke State School in honour of Parke who was killed in a farm accident in November 1913 (although this name was already in unofficial use at time of its opening).

Education 
Parke State School is a government primary (Prep-6) school for boys and girls at 400 Teddington Road. In 2017, the school had an enrolment of 58 students with  4 teachers and 5 non-teaching staff (3 full-time equivalent).

There is no secondary school in Tinana South; the nearest one is in Maryborough.

References 

Fraser Coast Region
Localities in Queensland